Serpil Senelmis is an Australian broadcaster and public speaker with Turkish heritage.

Senelmis is Director of Written & Recorded. Prior to this she was Senior Radio Producer with Radio National and a Presenter on Local Radio at the Australian Broadcasting Corporation. She was part of the broadcast team at the Dawn Service in Gallipoli in 2014 and for the centenary of the Gallipoli Campaign ANZAC landings in 2015.

Senelmis has often reported on the Turkish perspective of the Gallipoli Campaign in Australia and spoken about it on Australian television, radio and public forums.

She also hosts panel discussions with the Wheeler Centre and at events including the Feminist Writers Festival.

As a first generation Australian, Serpil feels a strong connection to her birth country Australia and her parents homeland Turkey.

Early years
Senelmis was born in Tatura, Victoria after her father, a cabinet-maker, came to Australia with her mother and eight-month-old sister from Nevsehir in Turkey in 1969.

Media career
After graduating from the WAAPA, Senelmis worked as a print journalist for street press in Perth including Xpress and Nova Holistic Journal.

As a radio producer, Senelmis has worked with Jon Faine, Helen Razer, Derryn Hinch, Waleed Aly, singer Clare Bowditch and comedians Nazeem Hussain and Tony Moclair. She had a long working career with John Safran and Father Bob Maguire as the producer of Sunday Night Safran on Triple J. She also produced Sunday Extra with Jonathan Green on Radio National.

As a radio presenter Senelmis highlights topics and people that are often overlooked, such as the art and activism of young Indian woman Kaanchi Chopra.

Senelmis's documentary work has included a retrospective look at Turkish music from the 1960s and coverage of the Turkish history of the Gallipoli Campaign. Her documentary work has been cited in the peer reviewed journal Contemporary Review of the Middle East.

Senelmis has hosted public forums on a wide variety of topics with The Wheeler Centre, including Race and Dating, Judy Horacek's cartoons, and the Turkish perspective of the Gallipoli Campaign.

Senelmis is a regular guest on The Conversation Hour with Jon Faine on ABC Radio Melbourne

Personal life 
Senelmis enjoys running and is a volunteer with Parkrun in Melbourne

References

Australian people of Turkish descent
Australian radio and television personalities
Australian radio producers
Year of birth missing (living people)
Living people